Andrzej Pluciński (November 13, 1915 in Kraków – August 27, 1963) was a Polish basketball player, who competed in the 1936 Summer Olympics.

He was part of the Polish basketball team, which finished fourth in the Olympic tournament. He played in all six matches.

References

External links
profile

1915 births
1963 deaths
Olympic basketball players of Poland
Basketball players at the 1936 Summer Olympics
Sportspeople from Kraków
Polish Austro-Hungarians